Chegondi Anantha Sriram is an Indian songwriter who predominantly works in Telugu cinema.

Career 
Sriram has written lyrics for 990 Telugu film songs in his fourteen-year-long career in the industry. Kaadante Aunanile was the first film he worked on. He gained prominence after he wrote songs for Chiranjeevi's Andarivaadu and Stalin. He has worked with top music directors including A.R. Rahman, Keeravani and Illayaraja.

Besides a Filmfare award for Yeto Vellipoyindhi Manasu, he has received a host of other honours. He also made a cameo appearance in the film Saakshyam (2018) as a game designer.

Discography

Filmography

Television

Awards 
 Filmfare Award for Best Lyricist – Telugu – Yeto Vellipoyindhi Manasu in 2013
 SIIMA Award for Best Lyricist (Telugu) – Anantha Sriram for Seethamma Vakitlo Sirimalle Chettu in 2014
 Maa Music Awards 2012 – Best Love Song (Jury)
 Nandi Award for Best Lyricist for Yeto Vellipoyindhi Manasu
Mirchi Music Awards South 2021 – Lyricist of the Decade "Taanu Nenu" from Sahasam Swasaga Sagipo

References

External links 
 

Living people
Indian lyricists
1984 births
People from Palakollu

People from West Godavari district
South Indian International Movie Awards winners
Filmfare Awards South winners
Nandi Award winners
Indian songwriters
Telugu-language lyricists